Eucinostomus havana commonly known as the bigeye mojarra, is a widespread species of fish found from South Florida and the Caribbean west to the Gulf of Mexico and as far south as the Eastern coasts of Brazil. It stalks sandy grounds with vegetation and feeds on invertebrates. Mojarra are of little food value, but may be processed into fishmeal.

References

Gerreidae
Fish described in 1912